Podocarpus perrieri is a species of conifer in the family Podocarpaceae. It is found only in Madagascar.

References

Sources

perrieri
Endemic flora of Madagascar
Trees of Madagascar
Critically endangered flora of Africa
Taxonomy articles created by Polbot
Flora of the Madagascar subhumid forests